Ch'iyara Salla (Aymara ch'iyara black, salla rocks, cliffs, "black cliff", also spelled Chiarasalla) is a  mountain in the Andes of Bolivia. It is situated in the La Paz Department, Pacajes Province, Charaña Municipality. It lies south-west of the mountain Kunturiri and west of K'illima Parki.

References 

Mountains of La Paz Department (Bolivia)